6th ZAI Awards

Presenter(s)  

Broadcaster STV 

Grand Prix Marika Gombitová

◄ 5th │ 7th ►

The 6th ZAI Awards, honoring the best in the Slovak music industry for individual achievements for the year of 1995, took time and place on March 2, 1996, at the West Theater in Bratislava.

Winners

Main categories

Others

References

External links
 ZAI Awards > Winners (Official site)
 ZAI Awards > 1995 Winners (at SME)

06
Zai Awards
1995 music awards